Cyril Tommasone (born 4 July 1987 in Villeurbanne) is a French artistic gymnast.
 His strongest apparatus is the pommel horse and parallel bars.

Career
He started gymnastics at age 7 and trains at the Convention Gymnique de Lyon with Yann Cucherat, under coach, Anatoly Vorontsov. He has been a member of the France team since 2000 where he finished first in the Espoir Championships (Championnats de France Espoir).  At the French Elite Championships (Championnats de France Elite) in France in 2010 in Albertville, he finished first in the competition on parallel bars and floor. At the 2010 European Men's Artistic Gymnastics Championships in Birmingham he won a bronze medal with the French team. The following year, he won a silver medal at the 2011 World Artistic Gymnastics Championships in Tokyo and silver medal at the 2011 European Artistic Gymnastics Championships in Berlin, both in the pommel horse.

He competed for the national team at the 2012 Summer Olympics in the Men's artistic team all-around.

References

External links 
 
 
 
 

1987 births
Living people
French male artistic gymnasts
Olympic gymnasts of France
Gymnasts at the 2012 Summer Olympics
Gymnasts at the 2016 Summer Olympics
People from Villeurbanne
Medalists at the World Artistic Gymnastics Championships
Universiade medalists in gymnastics
Competitors at the 2018 Mediterranean Games
Mediterranean Games gold medalists for France
Mediterranean Games bronze medalists for France
Mediterranean Games medalists in gymnastics
Universiade gold medalists for France
European Games competitors for France
Gymnasts at the 2019 European Games
Gymnasts at the 2020 Summer Olympics
Sportspeople from Lyon Metropolis
21st-century French people